Riz gras or riz au gras is a meat- and rice-based dish in Beninese, Burkinabé, Guinean, Ivorian, and Togolese cuisines, in West Africa. It is also prepared in other African countries, such as Senegal, where it is called tiebou djen and is prepared with significant amounts of fish and meat. In English-speaking West Africa, the dish is called Jollof rice.

Riz gras is often served at parties in urban areas of Burkina Faso. Riz gras is prepared with significant amounts of meat and vegetables, and is usually served atop rice. Additional ingredients used include tomatoes, eggplant, bell peppers, carrots, cabbage, onion, garlic, meat or vegetable stock, oil and salt.

Gallery

See also
 List of rice dishes
 Sindhi biryani

References

External links
 

Beninese cuisine
Burkinabé cuisine
Guinean cuisine
Ivorian cuisine
Meat dishes
National dishes
Rice dishes
Senegalese cuisine
Togolese cuisine